Jeffrey Ward (born 22 June 1961) is a British-American former professional motocross racer, auto racing driver and off-road racer. He won the AMA Motocross Championship five times and the AMA Supercross Championship twice and the Motocross des Nations seven times. After retiring from motorcycle competition, Ward turned to auto racing, finishing in second place at the Indianapolis 500 and winning a race at the Texas Motor Speedway. He then competed in off-road truck racing and rallycross. Ward was inducted into the Motorcycle Hall of Fame in 1999 and, was inducted into the Motorsports Hall of Fame of America on 12 August 2006.

Motocross racing career
Born in Glasgow, Scotland, Ward moved to the United States with his family when he was four years old. He began to compete in mini-bike motocross racing in Southern California in the 1960s, just as the sport of motocross was experiencing a burgeoning popularity in the United States. Ward became one of the most accomplished mini-bike motocross racers of his era. He appeared in the 1971 motorcycle documentary film, On Any Sunday when he was 10 years old, performing a long wheelie on his mini-bike.

Ward began his professional motocross career in 1978 riding a Suzuki in the 125cc class. The following year, he joined the Kawasaki factory racing team and, would remain with the company for the duration of his motocross career.

Ward won his first AMA national in 1982 and, in 1984 he won his first AMA national championship in the 125cc class, winning eight out of 10 races. It also marked the first 125cc national title for Kawasaki. Ward continued to improve in 1985, edging out Broc Glover to win the Supercross national championship and then capturing the 250cc motocross national championship. He competed in both the 250cc and 500cc national championships in 1986, finishing fourth in the 250cc series and third in the 500cc championship. Ward won his second AMA Supercross championship in 1987 over Ricky Johnson however, he finished second to Johnson in the 250cc national championship. The rivalry with Johnson continued in the 1988 250cc motocross national championship with both Ward and Johnson winning three races, but Ward prevailed by seven points to claim the championship over Johnson.

In 1989, Ward finished second to Jeff Stanton in the 250cc national championship but, defeated Stanton in the 500cc championship thus, becoming the first rider to win AMA motocross national championships in the 125, 250 and 500cc classes. He successfully defended his 500cc crown in 1990 then, finished second in the 1991 500cc championship, nine points behind Jean-Michel Bayle. Ward retired from professional motocross competition after finishing in third place in the 1992 500cc national championship.

In 15 seasons, Ward won a total of 56 national races placing him third on the all-time AMA motocross/Supercross win list at the time of his retirement. He won a total of seven AMA national championships, tying Bob Hannah and Ricky Johnson for the most career motocross and Supercross championships at the time of his retirement. In international motocross competition, Ward was a member of 7 winning U.S. Motocross des Nations teams, and a member of 2 Trophée des Nations winning teams.

Auto racing career

After the end of his motocross career, Ward still had a desire for competition and turned his attention to open-wheel auto racing in the Indy Racing League. He quickly proved to be competitive with a fourth-place finish in the Phoenix round of the 1993 Indy Lights season and a third-place finish at the Nazareth Speedway during the 1994 season. At the 1997 Indianapolis 500 while competing for the Cheever Racing team, Ward qualified on the third row and led the race for 49 laps before finishing the race in third place. His performance earned him the 1997 Indianapolis 500 Rookie of the Year award. He improved to a 6th-place finish in the 1998 Indy Racing League season while competing for the ISM Racing team. Ward was contracted to drive for the Pagan Racing team during the 1999 Indy Racing League season and, began the year with a third place at the season opening round at the Walt Disney World Speedway and a second place in Phoenix. He followed this with an impressive second place at the 1999 Indianapolis 500. Ward suffered inconsistent results for the remainder of the 1999 season to finish 11th in the championship. He won the 2002 race at Texas Motor Speedway for the Chip Ganassi Racing team, marking his first and only Indy Car victory. During his open-wheel auto racing career, Ward garnered three top five finishes in seven starts at the Indianapolis 500.

Return to motorcycle racing

At the age of 43, Ward returned to motorcycle racing and won the 2004 AMA Supermoto Championship competing against riders half his age. He won a second Supermoto championship in 2006 at the age of 45. Ward also won the Moto X category at the 2006 X Games, becoming the oldest male gold medalist and the oldest Moto X medalist in X Games history. In 2008, he repeated as the winner of the Moto X category of the 2008 X Games.

Off-road racing

From Indy Car racing, Ward progressed to off-road truck racing, competing in the 2009 Lucas Oil Off Road Racing Series for the Speed Technologies team. He also competed in the 2013 Stadium Super Trucks Series, finishing 10th in the inaugural race at University of Phoenix Stadium. Ward competed in the Global RallyCross Championship for the Chip Ganassi Racing team in 2015, serving as a replacement driver for former motocross racer Brian Deegan.

Awards and championships

Awards
 Ward was inducted into the Motorcycle Hall of Fame in 1999.
 Ward was inducted into the Motorsports Hall of Fame of America in 2006.

Championships

AMA Motocross / Supermoto
 1984—Won AMA 125cc national motocross title.
 1985—Won AMA national 250cc motocross and Supercross titles.
 1987—Won second AMA national 250cc Supercross championship.
 1988—Captured second AMA national 250cc motocross title.
 1989—Won AMA national 500cc motocross championship to become first rider in history to win every major AMA national motocross title.
 1990—Won second consecutive AMA national 500cc motocross championship.
 2004—Won AMA Supermoto Championship at 43 years of age.
 2006—Won X-Games Supermoto Championship at 45 years of age.
 2006—Won AMA Supermoto Championship (second title)
 2008—Won X-Games Supermoto Championship at 47 years of age (second title).

Indy Racing League
 1997—Finished third at Indianapolis 500 in maiden effort, finished 30th in IRL season point standings.
 1998—Earned career-first pole position at Phoenix IRL race, four top five finishes, finished career-best 6th in IRL season point standings.
 1999—Finished career-best second at Indianapolis 500, three top five finishes, finished 11th in IRL season point standings.
 2000—Finished fourth at Indianapolis 500, two top five finishes, finished 11th in IRL season point standings.
 2001—Two top five finishes, finished 11th in IRL season point standings.
 2002—Winner of Boomtown 500 at Texas Motor Speedway, finished ninth at Indianapolis 500, two top five finishes, finished 11th in IRL season point standings.

Lucas Oil Off Road Racing Series
 2009—Lucas Oil Off Road Racing Series Rookie of the Year
 2009—Dirt Sports Rookie of the Year
 2009—2nd Place in Lucas Oil Off Road Racing Series Championship, behind by 1 point

Racing record

Complete American Open Wheel Racing results
(key)

IRL IndyCar Series

Indianapolis 500

NASCAR
(key) (Bold – Pole position awarded by qualifying time. Italics – Pole position earned by points standings or practice time. * – Most laps led.)

Winston Cup Series

Complete Global RallyCross Championship results

Supercar

Race cancelled.

Stadium Super Trucks
(key) (Bold – Pole position. Italics – Fastest qualifier. * – Most laps led.)

References

External links
 

1961 births
Living people
Scottish emigrants to the United States
Sportspeople from Newport Beach, California
Sportspeople from Glasgow
American motocross riders
AMA Motocross Championship National Champions
Racing drivers from California
IndyCar Series drivers
Indianapolis 500 drivers
Indianapolis 500 Rookies of the Year
Indy Lights drivers
X Games athletes
24 Hours of Daytona drivers
Barber Pro Series drivers
Global RallyCross Championship drivers
Stadium Super Trucks drivers
Chip Ganassi Racing drivers
Cheever Racing drivers
A. J. Foyt Enterprises drivers
Vision Racing drivers